Possession is the third studio album by classical guitarist Lily Afshar released in 2002 through Archer Records.

Track list

Reception 
The album was reviewed well "...the exciting music and playing, the recording is clean and lively ", "...Ms. Afshar attacks her guitar creating an explosion of sound..."

Personnel 
 Lily Afshar - Classical guitar

External links 
Official website
Myspace page
Facebook page
 Last.fm page

References 

2002 classical albums
World music albums
Archer Records albums